Al-Jinn (“The Jinn”) is the 72nd chapter (sūrah) of the Quran with 28 verses (āyāt). The name as well as the topic of this chapter is jinn. Similar to angels, the jinn are beings invisible to the naked human eye. In the Quran, it is stated in that humans are created from the earth and jinn from smokeless fire.

Although Al-Jinn is a Meccan surah, it is generally agreed that it was revealed much later than any other sura contained in Juz' Tabāraka -lladhi (which covers surahs 67 to 77). Abdullah Yusuf Ali says that it is "tolerably certain" that Al-Jinn was revealed around 2 B.H. when Muhammad was evangelising near present-day Ta'if. Maulana Muhammad Ali agrees with the date of around 2 B.H., saying that this surah was revealed at a time when opposition to the Prophet's message was reaching a climax.

Summary
1-2 Certain of the genii converted to Islam by hearing the Quran  
3-7 The folly of men and genii in ascribing offspring to God
8-9 Genii prying into heavenly secrets are driven away with fiery darts
10-14 Different classes of genii, some Muslims and others infidels
15-18 Believing genii rewarded in Paradise, the unbelievers punished in hell
19 The genii pressed upon Muhammad to hear the Quran
20-24 Muhammad can only publish what hath been revealed to him
25-26 The judgments of God shall overtake the unbelievers
27-28 God revealeth his secrets to his apostles only

Exegesis

2  Jinn recant their belief in false gods 
In the second verse the jinn recant their belief in false gods and venerate Muhammad for his monotheism. The jinn apologize for their past blasphemy and criticize mankind for either neglecting them or encouraging their disbelief.

7  Islamic Judgement Day, Qiyamah
The Judgement in verse 7, and the punishment in verse 25, are both references to the Islamic Judgement Day, Qiyamah.

20-22  Monotheism among the Jinn is reaffirmed
Verses 20-22 are especially important as Monotheism (tawhid) among the Jinn is reaffirmed and the inescapable wrath of God is emphasized.

25-28 Qiyamah is known only to God
Verses 25-28 establish that Qiyamah is known only to God, and that God takes into account all the deeds of a man when judging him.

See also
 Mosque of the Jinn

References

External links

Islamic mythology
Jinn
Exorcism in Islam
Jinn